Half the World Is Watching Me is the second album by Danish alternative rock band Mew, released on their own record label Evil Office in 2000.  The album was originally printed in about only 5,000 copies, but has been reissued twice for wider distribution. The reissued version released 4 September 2007 includes a nine-track bonus disc. The original release and the 2007 reissue include a hidden track, "Ending". The final 11 seconds of "Ending" are in fact the first 11 seconds at the start of "Am I Wry? No" before the drums kick in.

Track listing

Original release
 "Ending" – 2:01
 "Am I Wry? No" – 4:53
 "Mica" – 2:58
 "Saliva" – 4:08
 "King Christian" – 4:24
 "Her Voice Is Beyond Her Years" – 4:24
 "156" – 4:46
 "Symmetry" – 5:18
 "Comforting Sounds" – 8:44

To find the hidden track "Ending", which is identified by the purple circle at the center of the disc, start the opening track "Am I Wry? No" and rewind past 0:00.

Bonus tracks on first reissue
 "She Came Home for Christmas" – 4:01
 "I Should Have Been a Tsin-Tsi (For You)" – 2:01

This version did not include the hidden track "Ending", but added 2 bonus tracks (which are versions unique to this record). It is identifiable by a slightly different cover where the text has a white border, and an expanded booklet with full-page photographs of the band members. The disc is reflective, not totally white like the original release.

2007 reissue bonus disc
 "Half The World Is Watching Me" (studio outtake) – 3:04
 "Her Voice Is Beyond Her Years" (live) – 3:18
 "Mica" (live) – 3:42
 "Wheels Over Me" (live) – 2:42
 "Wherever" (live) – 5:31
 "156" (Cubase demo) – 5:22
 "Quietly" (demo) – 3:29
 "Comforting Sounds (Do I Look Puerto Rican?)" (demo) – 7:48

Personnel

Mew
Jonas Bjerre - electric guitars, acoustic guitars, piano, synthesizers
Bo Madsen - electric guitars, acoustic guitars
Johan Wohlert - bass, guitars
Silas Utke Graae Jørgensen - drums, percussion, tympani, drum machine

Additional personnel
Tim Christensen - Mellotron
Klaus Nielson - synthesizers (tracks 1, 4, 6, 7)
Mads Hyhne and Kasper Tranberg - horns
Flemming Rasmussen and Morten Sidenius - co-producer
Flemming Rasmussen - engineer, mixer
Jan Eliasson and Morten Bue - mastering engineer

References

Mew (band) albums
2000 albums